Daggubati Purandeswari (born 22 April 1959) is an Indian politician from the state of Andhra Pradesh. Her eloquence, articulation and impassioned speeches have earned her the title of the "Sushma Swaraj of the South". She represented the Visakhapatnam constituency of Andhra Pradesh as a Member of Parliament of Indian National Congress in the 15th Lok Sabha of India. She defeated her opponent, Palla Srinivasa Rao of the Telugu Desam Party, by a margin of nearly 60,000 votes. She was made the Minister of State in the Ministry of Human Resource Development in 2009 and subsequently the MoS in the Ministry of Commerce and Industry in 2012. She had previously represented the Bapatla constituency in the 14th Lok Sabha on behalf of the Indian National Congress, beating D. Ramanaidu of the Telugu Desam Party by almost 90,000 votes. During that term she served as the Minister of State in the Ministry of Human Resource Development. She joined the Bharatiya Janata Party (BJP) on 7 March 2014 after resigning from the Indian National Congress as a mark of protest against the bifurcation of Andhra Pradesh that was favoured by the then United Progressive Alliance government. In 2014, she fought the Lok Sabha election on a BJP ticket from Rajampet and lost. Purandareswari was appointed BJP Mahila Morcha Prabhari. She continues as the appointed state in-charge of the Bharatiya Janata Party, Odisha unit since 13 November 2020.

As a Member of Parliament 
Purandeswari participated in debate on various bills such as 'Domestic Violence Bill, Hindu Succession Amendment Bill, and the bill on the establishment of special courts exclusively for trying cases of women to name a few' and made meaningful contributions. In appreciation of her performance in Parliament, the Asian Age adjudged her as the best Parliamentarian for 2004–05.

Life and education 
Born to N. T. Rama Rao and Basavatarakam, she did her schooling from Sacred Heart Matriculation Higher Secondary School, Church Park, Chennai.  She is their second daughter and has 7 brothers and 3 sisters. She has a Bachelor of Arts from the South Indian Educational Trust and Women College (Chennai) (renamed as the Bashir Ahmed Sayeed College for Women) in literature in 1979, followed by a Diploma in gemmology at the Gemmological Institute of India in 1996. Later she established Hyderabad Institute of Gem and Jewellery in 1997. She can read, write and speak five languages, English, Telugu, Tamil, Hindi and French. She is versatile in the Indian dance form Kuchipudi. She married Daggubati Venkateswara Rao on 9 May 1979 and they have a daughter, Nivedita and son, Hitesh Chenchuram. She is a sister to Nandamuri Harikrishna and Nandamuri Balakrishna, sister-in-law to N. Chandrababu Naidu, niece to N. Trivikrama Rao, aunt to Nara Lokesh and  Nandamuri Kalyan Ram, N. T. Rama Rao Jr., Nandamuri Suhasini and Taraka Ratna.

References

External links
 Biographical sketch, Parliament of India
 Official Website of D. Purandeswari

Bharatiya Janata Party politicians from Andhra Pradesh
Telugu politicians
Indian Hindus
India MPs 2004–2009
India MPs 2009–2014
Union ministers of state of India
1959 births
Living people
Women in Andhra Pradesh politics
Lok Sabha members from Andhra Pradesh
National Democratic Alliance candidates in the 2014 Indian general election
Indian National Congress politicians from Andhra Pradesh
21st-century Indian women politicians
21st-century Indian politicians
Women union ministers of state of India
Women members of the Lok Sabha
National Democratic Alliance candidates in the 2019 Indian general election